The 1965 Buffalo Bulls football team represented the University at Buffalo in the 1965 NCAA University Division football season. The Bulls offense scored 145 points while the defense allowed 78 points.

Schedule

References

Buffalo
Buffalo Bulls football seasons
Buffalo Bulls football